Highland Township is a township in Washington County, Iowa, USA.

History
Highland Township was established in 1854.

References

Townships in Washington County, Iowa
Townships in Iowa
1854 establishments in Iowa
Populated places established in 1854